Zerrenthin is a railway station in the village of Zerrenthin, Mecklenburg-Vorpommern, Germany. The station lies of the Bützow–Szczecin railway and the train services are operated by Deutsche Bahn.

Train services
The station is served by the following services:
regional express (RE 6) Lübeck - Bad Kleinen - Güstrow - Neubrandenburg - Pasewalk - Szczecin

References

External links
Deutsche Bahn website

Railway stations in Mecklenburg-Western Pomerania
Railway stations in Germany opened in 1880
Buildings and structures in Vorpommern-Greifswald